Ja-kyung (자경) is a Korean unisex given name. The meaning differs based on the hanja used to write each syllable of the name. There are 28 hanja with the reading "ja" and 54 hanja with the reading "kyung" on the South Korean government's official list of hanja which may be used in given names. 

Fictional characters with this name include:
Kim Ja-kyung, in 2014 South Korean television series Mother's Garden
Lee Ja-kyung, in 2005 South Korean television series Dear Heaven
Yoon Ja-kyung, in 2005 South Korean television series Loveholic

See also
List of Korean given names

References

Korean unisex given names